Amenfi West is one of the constituencies represented in the Parliament of Ghana. It elects one Member of Parliament (MP) by the first past the post system of election. Amenfi West is located in the Wasa Amenfi West district of the Western Region of Ghana.

Boundaries
The seat is located entirely within the Wasa Amenfi West district of the Western Region of Ghana.

Members of Parliament

Elections

 
 
 
 
 
 
 

 
 
 
 

 

 
 
 
 
 
 
 

Mrs. Agnes Sonful (NPP), a teacher, 52, won the by-election held on 24 April 2003with a majority of 4,121 due to the resignation of Abraham Kofi Asante on 26 March 2003.

See also
List of Ghana Parliament constituencies

References 

Parliamentary constituencies in the Western Region (Ghana)